Khalk ovozi (Voice of the People) is a thrice-weekly newspaper published in Dusanbe, Tajikistan.

History and profile
Khalk Ovozi was established in 1929 and is published by the Parliament of Tajikistan. Written in the Uzbek language, it is one of the most widely circulated papers in the country.

References

Newspapers published in Tajikistan
Publications established in 1929
State media
Uzbek-language newspapers
Mass media in Dushanbe
1929 establishments in the Soviet Union
Communist newspapers